On 20 September 2021, a mass shooting occurred at Perm State University, in the city of Perm, Perm Krai, Russia. Six people were killed and 47 others were injured. The attacker, identified as 18-year-old Timur Bekmansurov, was arrested after being wounded by police.

Background 
The shooting occurred roughly four months after another school shooting in Kazan, Russia, in which nine people were killed. In the aftermath of that shooting, the legal age to buy a gun in Russia was increased from 18 to 21, but the law was not yet in effect at the time of the Perm shooting. Authorities had blamed previous school shootings on foreign influence from news of similar incidents in the United States and elsewhere.

Shooting 
While the university has 12,000 students enrolled, only 3,000 individuals were on campus at the time of the shooting. The shooter was tracked by security cameras walking towards the university around 11:30 am while carrying a shotgun. He was able to overpower and injure the security guard before the guard was able to activate a panic button. A student at the college said that he heard gunshots while travelling in the elevator, and that he saw what he believed to be the gunman shooting at two female students who were trying to escape.

Students and teachers inside the school, who were involved in lessons at the time, used furniture such as chairs to barricade the internal doors closed. Meanwhile, video footage from outside the school showed students using classroom windows to escape, and the gunman walking outside the building. Police arrived at the scene and challenged the gunman, with a gunfight ensuing. The suspect was wounded while resisting arrest and taken to a local hospital to be treated. As of October 5th 2021, the perpetrator had regained consciousness after requiring a leg amputation for the injuries sustained during the gun fight with the police.

Victims 
Six people were killed during the shooting. They were identified as five women and one man, aged between 18 and 66 years old:

1. Yaroslav Aramelev — 19 years (student. Died first, outside the building);

2. Margarita Engaus — 66 years (grandmother of one of the survived students);

3. Anna Aigeldina — 24 years (a former student, who came on that day to get her diploma); 

4. Alexandra Mokhova — 20 years (student);

5. Ksenia Samchenko — 18 years (student);

6. Ekaterina Shakirova — 19 years (student, was killed along with Samchenko).

43 others were injured, with all except the gunman in stable condition by 22 September.

Perpetrator 
Russian police named 18-year-old law student Timur Bekmansurov (Russian: Тимур Бекмансуров) (born March 8, 2003) as the gunman. Prior to the shooting, Bekmansurov had posted an image of himself with a shotgun, helmet, and ammunition to his VK account. He captioned the photo with the statement: "I've thought about this for a long time, it's been years and I realized the time has come to do what I dreamt of". In the post, he also said he was "overflowing with hate" and clarified, "What happened was not a terrorist attack (at least from a legal point of view). I was not a member of an extremist organization, I was nonreligious and apolitical. Nobody knew what I was going to do, I carried out all these actions myself."

A spokesperson for the Russian National Guard told reporters that Bekmansurov legally owned a shotgun for hunting as well.

Legal proceedings 
A criminal case against the attacker was initiated under Part 2 of Art. 105 (murder of two or more persons), Part 3, Art. 30 (attempted crime), Art. 317 (encroachment on the life of a law enforcement officer) and under Part 2 of Art. 167 (damage to another's property in a generally dangerous way) of the Criminal Code of the Russian Federation. Relatives of the dead and those injured in the shooting filed suits against the defendant for moral damages in the total amount of 24.91 million rubles. 

According to the results of a psychiatric examination, Bekmansurov was diagnosed with schizoid personality disorder, but he was declared sane.

In November 2022, the state prosecution demanded that Bekmansurov be sentenced to life imprisonment. Bekmansurov admitted his guilt in full in court, expressed remorse and asked the court not to sentence him to life imprisonment. But the court refused and on December 28, 2022 sentenced Timur Bekmansurov to life imprisonment.

Aftermath 
Students, faculty, and residents of Perm used the exterior fence of the university to create a makeshift memorial with carnations, candles, photos, and other items.

Authorities have blamed foreign influence for previous school shootings and the attack has brought forward additional questions and potential legal changes. Kremlin spokesman Dmitry Peskov announced on 20 September that legislative action had already been taken to further restrict gun purchases.

See also
 2021 Kazan school shooting
 2022 Izhevsk school shooting
 2014 Moscow school shooting
 Kerch Polytechnic College massacre
 List of mass shootings in Russia
 List of school massacres by death toll

References

2021 mass shootings in Europe
2021 murders in Russia
21st-century mass murder in Russia
Attacks on buildings and structures in 2021
Mass murder in 2021
Mass shootings in Russia
Shooting
School killings in Russia
School shootings in Russia
September 2021 crimes in Europe
September 2021 events in Russia
University and college killings
University and college shootings
Filmed killings